Tallent may refer to:

Tallent (surname)
Tallent, Missouri, an unincorporated community in the United States
Tallent Town, Virginia, an unincorporated community in the United States